de Burgh (also spelt de Bourgh, and Burke, and also Latinised as de Burgo) is an Anglo-Norman surname deriving from the ancient Anglo-Norman and Hiberno-Norman noble dynasty, the House of Burgh. In Ireland, the descendants of William de Burgh (c.1160–1206) had the surname de Burgh which was gaelicised in Irish as de Búrca and over the centuries became Búrc then Burke and Bourke.

Notable people with this name include:

Surname

A
 Aoife de Búrca (1885–1974), born Eva Burke, Red Cross nurse during the Irish Easter Rising

C

 Coralie de Burgh (1924–2015), British Irish painter
 Cameron de Burgh (born 1971), Australian Paralympic swimmer
 Chris de Burgh (born 1948), musician and songwriter

D
 David de Burca or David de Burgh, 15th Mac William Iochtar (alive 1537), Irish chieftain and noble

E

 Edmond Albanach de Burgh (d.1375), Lord of Connaught
 Edmond de Burca or Edmond de Burgh, 12th Mac William Iochtar (died 1527), Irish chieftain and noble
 Edmund na Féasóige de Burca or Edmund de Burgh, 4th Mac William Iochtar (died 1458), Irish chieftain and noble 
 Elizabeth de Burgh (disambiguation)
Elizabeth de Burgh (c.1289–1327), queen of Scotland, wife of Robert the Bruce
Elizabeth de Clare or de Burgh (1295–1360), founder of Clare College, sister-in-law of Queen Elizabeth de Burgh
Elizabeth de Burgh, 4th Countess of Ulster (1332–1363) granddaughter of Elizabeth de Clare
 Emily Charlotte de Burgh, Countess of Cork (1828–1912), British poet and writer
 Eric de Burgh (1881–1973), British Indian Army officer
 Ernest Macartney de Burgh (1863–1929), Irish-born Australian civil engineer

G
 Geoffrey de Burgh (c.1180–1228), English Bishop of Ely
 Gylle de Burgh (fl. 1332),  Anglo-Irish noblewoman

H
 Henry de Burgh, 1st Marquess of Clanricarde (1742–1797), Irish peer and politician 
 Hubert de Burgh, 1st Earl of Kent (c.1180–1243), Justiciar of England and Ireland
 Hubert de Burgh (cricketer) (1879–1960), Irish cricketer and Royal Naval Officer
 Hubert de Burgh-Canning, 2nd Marquess of Clanricarde (1832–1916), Irish politician
 Hugh de Burgh (d.c.1351), Irish crown official and judge
 Hugo de Burgh (21st century), British journalism theorist and academic

J
 John de Burgh (disambiguation)
 John de Burgh (d.1271), son of Hubert de Burgh and son in law of William de Lanvallei
 John de Burgh (1286–1313) (1286–1313), Irish heir apparent to the Earldom of Ulster
 John Smith de Burgh, 11th Earl of Clanricarde or John Smith Burke (1720–1782), Irish peer
 John de Burgh, 13th Earl of Clanricarde (1744–1808), Irish nobleman, politician and cricketer
 John de Burgh (bishop) (1590–1667), Roman Catholic archbishop of Tuam
 Jon de Burgh Miller (21st century), English science fiction writer

M
 Margery de Burgh (1224–1252), Norman-Irish noblewoman

R
 Richard de Burgh (disambiguation)
 Richard Mor de Burgh (c.1194–1242), eldest son of William de Burgh
 Richard Óg de Burgh, 2nd Earl of Ulster (1259–1326), Irish nobleman
 Richard Burke, 4th Earl of Clanricarde or Richard de Burgh (1572–1635), Irish nobleman
 Richard Burke, 8th Earl of Clanricarde or Richard de Burgh (d.1704), Irish nobleman
 Risdeárd de Burca or Ruchard de Burgh, 6th Mac William Íochtar (died 1473), Irish chieftain and noble

T
 Thomas de Burgh (1670–1730), Irish soldier, architect and politician
 Tomás Óg de Burca or Tomás Óg de Burgh, 5th Mac William Iochtar (died 1460), Irish chieftain and noble
 Thomas mac Edmond Albanach de Burca or Thomas de Burgh, 2nd Mac William Iochtar (died 1402), Irish chieftain and noble

U

 Ulick de Burgh (disambiguation)
 Ulick Burke of Umhaill or Ulick de Burgh (d.1343), founder of the Bourkes of the Owles
 Ulick Burke of Annaghkeen or Ulick de Burgh, 1st Clanricarde or Mac William Uachtar (d.1343/1353),  Irish chieftain and noble 
 Ulick an Fhiona Burke Ulick de Burgh, 3rd Clanricarde or Mac William Uachtar (d.1424), Irish chieftain and noble 
 Ulick Fionn Burke or Ulick de Burgh, 6th Clanricarde or Mac William Uachtar (d.1509), Irish chieftain and noble 
 Ulick Burke, 3rd Earl of Clanricarde or Ulick de Burgh (died 1601), Irish noble 
 Ulick Burke, 1st Marquess of Clanricarde or Ulick de Burgh (1604–1657),  Irish noble 
 Ulick Burke, 1st Viscount Galway or Ulick de Burgh (1670-1691), Irish Jacobite
 Sir Ulick Burke, 3rd Baronet or Ulick de Burgh (d.1708), of Glinsk, MP for Galway County
 Ulick de Burgh, 1st Marquess of Clanricarde (1802–1874), British whig politician
 Ulick Canning de Burgh, Lord Dunkellin (1827–1867), Anglo-Irish soldier and politician
 Ulick Burke (politician), Irish Fine Gael politician
 Peter Burke (historian) or Ulick Peter Burke, British historian
 Sir Ulick Burke, 1st Baronet (c.1594–c.1660) of the Burke Baronets
 Sir Ulick Burke, 8th Baronet (d.1759) of the Burke Baronets
 Ulysses Burgh, 2nd Baron Downes or Ulysses de Burgh (1788–1864), Irish soldier and politician

W
 Walter de Burgh, 1st Earl of Ulster (c.1230–1271), founder of Athassel Priory
 Walter mac Thomas de Burca or Walter de Burgh, 3rd Mac William Iochtar (died 1440), Irish chieftain and noble
 William de Burgh (disambiguation)
 William de Burgh (1157–1206), Lord of Connaught
 William Óg de Burgh (died 1270), Irish chieftain
 William Donn de Burgh, 3rd Earl of Ulster (1312–1333), noble in the Peerage of Ireland
 William de Burgh (MP) (1741–1808), Anglo-Irish theologian, politician and anti-slavery campaigner
 William de Burgh (philosopher) (1866–1943), British philosopher.

Given name

 Danny Kinahan or Daniel de Burgh Kinahan (born 1958), Ulster Unionist Party (UUP) politician
 David Kenworthy, 11th Baron Strabolgi David Montague de Burgh Kenworthy (1914–2010), British peer
 De Burgh Fitzpatrick Persse (1840–1921), Australian politician
 Emily de Burgh Daly (1859–1935), Irish nurse, writer and traveller
 Garth Welch or Garth de Burgh Welch (born 1936), Australian dancer and choreographer
 Ivan De Burgh Daly (1893–1974), British experimental and animal physiologist
 Jon de Burgh Miller, British author
 Kenneth de Burgh Codrington (1899–1986), British archaeologist and art historian
 Reg Egan or Reginald Clarence De Burgh Egan (1927–2014), Australian rules footballer 
 Stanton Welch or Stanton De Burgh Welch (born 1969), Australian dancer and choreographer
 Ulick de Burgh Browne, 7th Marquess of Sligo (1898–1941), British and Irish peer and British army officer

Fictional characters
 Lady Catherine de Bourgh (character from Jane Austen's novel, Pride and Prejudice.

See also
 Burke (disambiguation)
 House of Burgh, an Anglo-Norman and Hiberno-Norman dynasty founded in 1193
 Clanricarde (Mac William Uachtar/Upper Mac William) or Galway (Upper Connaught) Burkes
 de Burgh-Canning
 Earl of Clanricarde, earldom in the Peerage of Ireland created in 1543 and 1800
 Lord of Connaught, title claimed in the Peerage of Ireland
 Earl of Ulster, earldom created in the Peerage of Ireland in 1264
 Bourke (disambiguation)
 Burgo (disambiguation)
 De Burghs Bridge, road bridge in Sydney, Australia
 Bourg (disambiguation)
 Dubourg, surname
 DeBerg, surname

References

Norman-language surnames